Private Joseph Henry Silk GC (14 August 1916 − 4 December 1943), of the Somerset Light Infantry was posthumously awarded the George Cross (GC) for his heroic self-sacrifice while serving in Burma (now Myanmar) during the Burma campaign of 1942−1943 of the Second World War.

During training Silk threw himself on an accidentally triggered grenade to save his comrades from the explosion which killed him instantly.

Notice of his award appeared in The London Gazette on 13 June 1944.

References

1916 births
1943 deaths
Somerset Light Infantry soldiers
British recipients of the George Cross
British Army personnel killed in World War II
Burials at Taukkyan War Cemetery
Military personnel from London
Accidental deaths in Myanmar
Deaths by hand grenade
People from Islington (district)